This is a list of years in Israel.

21st century

20th century

See also
Timeline of Israeli history
History of Israel
List of years in the Palestinian territories
Timeline of Zionism
Timeline of Jewish history
Timeline of Haifa
Timeline of Jerusalem
Timeline of Tel Aviv
List of years by country

 
Israel history-related lists
Israel